Achitende is a town in north-eastern Zambia. It is located in Kasama District in Northern Province.

Populated places in Northern Province, Zambia